In mathematics, a superabundant number (sometimes abbreviated as SA) is a certain kind of natural number. A natural number n is called superabundant precisely when, for all m < n

where σ denotes the sum-of-divisors function (i.e., the sum of all positive divisors of n, including n itself). The first few superabundant numbers are 1, 2, 4, 6, 12, 24, 36, 48, 60, 120, ... . For example, the number 5 is not a superabundant number because for 1, 2, 3, 4, and 5, the sigma is 1, 3, 4, 7, 6, and 7/4 > 6/5.

Unknown to Alaoglu and Erdős, about 30 pages of Ramanujan's 1915 paper "Highly Composite Numbers" were suppressed. Those pages were finally published in The Ramanujan Journal 1 (1997), 119–153. In section 59 of that paper, Ramanujan defines generalized highly composite numbers, which include the superabundant numbers.

Properties 

 proved that if n is superabundant, then there exist a k and a1, a2, ..., ak such that

where pi is the i-th prime number, and

Then in particular any superabundant number is an even integer, and it is a multiple of the k-th primorial 

In fact, the last exponent ak is equal to 1 except when n is 4 or 36.

Superabundant numbers are closely related to highly composite numbers. Not all superabundant numbers are highly composite numbers. In fact, only 449 superabundant and highly composite numbers are the same . For instance, 7560 is highly composite but not superabundant. Conversely, 1163962800 is superabundant but not highly composite.

Alaoglu and Erdős observed that all superabundant numbers are highly abundant. 

Not all superabundant numbers are Harshad numbers. The first exception is the 105th SA number, 149602080797769600.  The digit sum is 81, but 81 does not divide evenly into this SA number.

Superabundant numbers are also of interest in connection with the Riemann hypothesis, and with Robin's theorem that the Riemann hypothesis is equivalent to the statement that

for all n greater than the largest known exception, the superabundant number 5040. If this inequality has a larger counterexample, proving the Riemann hypothesis to be false, the smallest such counterexample must be a superabundant number .

Not all superabundant numbers are colossally abundant.

Extension 

1-super abundant numbers are superabundant numbers. 0-super abundant numbers are highly composite numbers.

For example, generalized 2-super abundant numbers are 1, 2, 4, 6, 12, 24, 48, 60, 120, 240, ...

References 
.
.
.

External links 
 MathWorld: Superabundant number

Divisor function
Integer sequences